Hassan Nasrallah (born 14 October 1982) is a Lebanese former footballer who played as a midfielder.

International career
Nasrallah played for Lebanon in two games in 2004, a friendly against Syria and at the 2004 WAFF Championship against Iran.

Honours
Ahed
 Lebanese Premier League: 2007–08
 Lebanese Super Cup: 2005, 2008
 Lebanese FA Cup runner-up: 2006–07

References

External links
 
 

1982 births
Living people
Association football midfielders
Lebanese footballers
Tadamon Sour SC players
Al Mabarra Club players
Sagesse SC footballers
Al Ahed FC players
Lebanese Premier League players
Lebanon international footballers